The 2022–23 South Africa women's Tri-Nation Series was a cricket tournament that took place in South Africa in January and February 2023 as a preparatory series before the 2023 ICC Women's T20 World Cup. It was a tri-nation series between India women, South Africa women and the West Indies women cricket teams, with the matches played as Women's Twenty20 International (WT20I) fixtures. In December 2022, Cricket South Africa confirmed the fixtures for the series, with all the matches to be played at Buffalo Park in East London.

The West Indies were eliminated after a 10-wicket defeat to South Africa in their third game of the round-robin stage. Chloe Tryon's unbeaten fifty in the final helped the hosts to claim a 5-wicket victory over India.

Squads

Before the tournament, Cherry-Ann Fraser was ruled out due to injury and was replaced in the squad by Shanika Bruce. The West Indies added Trishan Holder, Zaida James, Djenaba Joseph and Jannillea Glasgow to the squad as injury replacements for their final game of the tournament. All four players had competed in the recently concluded 2023 ICC Under-19 Women's T20 World Cup in South Africa.

Round-robin

Points table

 Advanced to the final

Fixtures

Final

Notes

References

External links
 Series home at ESPNcricinfo

2023 in Indian cricket
2023 in South African cricket
2023 in West Indian cricket
2023 in women's cricket
International cricket competitions in 2022–23
International women's cricket competitions in South Africa
Women's Twenty20 cricket international competitions
South Africa women's Tri-Nation Series
South Africa women's Tri-Nation Series